Shooting for Socrates is a 2014 Irish film co-written and directed by James Erskine and starting John Hannah, Richard Dormer and Sergio Mur as Brazilian footballer Sócrates.

Plot
During the 1986 FIFA World Cup the Northern Ireland national football team play against Brazil national football team in one of the most memorable games in Irish footballing history. The film follows the lives of passionate football supporter Arthur and his son Tommy from East Belfast. The lead up to a momentous day in the life of a young boy (his 10th birthday) mirrors the buildup to the big day for the football team as they play the greatest match of their lives.

Cast
John Hannah as Billy Bingham
Conleth Hill as Jackie Fullerton
Richard Dormer as Arthur
Nico Mirallegro as David Campbell
Ciaran McMenamin as Sammy McIlroy
Barry Ward as Jimmy Quinn
Bronagh Gallagher as Irene
Paul Kennedy as Pat Jennings
Chris Newman as Norman Whiteside
Aaron McCusker as Gerry Armstrong
Sergio Mur as Sócrates
Matthew McElhinney as Jimmy Nicholl
Art Parkinson as Tommy
Stephen Hagan as Phil Hughes
Andy Moore as Mal Donaghy
Patrick Buchanan as Alan McDonald
Gerard Jordan as Albert Kirk

Production
The scenes of the game in Estadio Jalisco in Guadalajara were recreated on Northern Ireland's home turf of Windsor Park in Belfast.

Release
The film had a limited cinema release in June 2015 before being released on DVD in October 2015. It was "DVD of the Week" in the Irish News.

Reception
On review aggregator Rotten Tomatoes, the film holds an approval rating of 29% based on 7 reviews, with an average rating of 4.67/10.

References

2014 films
Biographical films about sportspeople
Irish association football films
Irish sports drama films
Cultural depictions of Brazilian men
Cultural depictions of association football players
2010s sports drama films